Pastor Brown is a 2009 American Christian drama film. It was written by Rhonda Baraka and directed by Rockmond Dunbar. The film was shot in Atlanta, Georgia. Pastor Brown stars Salli Richardson, Nicole Ari Parker, Michael B. Jordan, Michael Beach, Monica, and Keith David.  This film was the debut of R&B singer Grammy-winner India.Arie as an actress.

The film made its television debut on the Lifetime network on Saturday, February 16, 2013.

Plot
When her father unexpectedly becomes terminally ill, Jessica ("Jesse"), an exotic dancer, returns home for the first time in over a decade. As her father's dying wish, he asks her to take over as head of Mount Olive Baptist Church. The news turns her and her family's life upside down. Jesse accepts her father's commission, thereby pitting herself against her sister and most of the leadership at Mount Olive who know her secret past.

Through accepting her father's request, Jesse embarks upon a course that changes her world forever. Not only does she reconnect with her family and her teenage son, but she also finds the dignity and self-love she lost so long ago.

Cast
Salli Richardson as Jessica Brown
Nicole Ari Parker as Tonya Copeland Brown
Tasha Smith as Angelique Todd
Michael Beach as Avery Callagan
Michael B. Jordan as Tariq Brown
Keith David as Pastor Joe Brown
Rockmond Dunbar as Amir
Monica as Lisa Cross
Tisha Campbell-Martin as Amanda Carlton
India Arie	as Lateefah
Ernie Hudson as Deacon Harold Todd
Dondre Whitfield as Chaz
Angie Stone as Rick Fredericks
Keith Sweat as Nasim
Mari Morrow as Adrian
Creflo Dollar as Preacher
Bryce Wilson as Hasan

References

External links

Pastor Brown

2009 films
African-American films
2009 drama films
American drama films
Films about evangelicalism
2000s American films